The Letov Š-28 was a Czechoslovak single-engined, two-seat reconnaissance aircraft. It was manufactured by Letov Kbely in a number of versions with different powerplants. The most important version was the Š-328, which was produced in relatively high quantities (412 planes produced).

History 

Design work started in 1932 to meet a requirement from the Finnish Air Force although they never accepted the type.  It first flew in 1934 and began equipping the Czechoslovak Air Force the following year. The machine was made in two versions—with wheeled undercarriage for land use and with floats for water operations. Although Czechoslovakia was a land-locked nation, a floatplane target tug was necessary for a Czechoslovak anti-aircraft artillery training depot in the Bay of Kotor (now in Montenegro) and four were built as the Š-328v (v stood for vodní or water). It was used as a reconnaissance aircraft, light bomber and ground-attack aircraft for the Czechoslovakia Air Force during the mid- and late-1930s and in that same role during the early months of World War II, when the Slovak Air Force came under German control following its occupation of Czechoslovakia in March 1939. 13 planes from first production batch were tested as night fighters, armed with four 7,92 mm vz.30 machine guns in the wings and two movable vz.30s for the observer. These were later modified for normal use because without radar whose effectiveness was minimal. 
At the time of the Munich agreement, which ended the Sudeten crisis the Czechoslovak Air Force had 227 planes in operational units and 87 in training schools and mobilisation depots. 
Production continued even after German occupation of Czechoslovakia until 1940, the last planes being 30 Š-328 produced for Bulgaria, and 50 planes of that type ordered by Slovakia in July 1938. Altogether, 412 Letov Š-328 were produced.

The Letov Š-328's combat record is vague but some sources suggest that some Š-328 landplanes may have been used during the Spanish Civil War however there is no evidence to confirm this and is likely a misidentification of another type.
The Germans used captured Š-328s both as trainers and in the night attack role on the Eastern Front in the Winter of 1942–43.  The Germans handed over some of these machines to their allies, Bulgaria, and Slovakia.

The Slovak Š-328s carried out reconnaissance and bombing sorties in support of the Slovak participation in the Invasion of Poland in September 1939. Following Slovakia's participation in the German Invasion of the Soviet Union in 1941, Slovak Š-328s were used for patrol and reconnaissance flights and a few of them also attacked soviet trucks and cars. They were again used in anti-partisan operations in western Ukraine in the summer of 1942. At least 11 Slovakian aircraft were seized by Slovak insurgents and flown against the Germans in late 1944 during the Slovak National Uprising in September to October 1944. The unit never had more than three aircraft operational at time, but they were an important asset. On 7 September 1944, this aircraft achieved one of the last downings of an enemy aircraft achieved by a biplane, when a patrolling Š-328 was attacked by a reconnaissance Focke-Wulf Fw 189. The Fw 189 was damaged by machine gun fire and forced to land in an area controlled by the insurgents.

Operators

Bulgarian Air Force purchased 62 Š-328s from Germany in 1939, naming them the Vrana (Crow), of which 30 were produced after German occupation of Czechoslovakia. Till 1942 they were also used for anti-submarine patrols over the Black Sea. They remained in service until at least September 1944.

Czechoslovakian Air Force
Czechoslovakian National Security Guard

Estonian Air Force

Luftwaffe

Royal Romanian Air Force - one Š-328 escorting train with refugees landed in Romania following the Slovak–Hungarian War. It was used for training until 1941 when it was retired following an accident.

Slovak Air Force
Slovak Insurgent Air Force

Variants
 Š-28 - prototype with Walter Castor engine (one built)
 Š-128 - production version with Gnome et Rhone-built Bristol Mercury VII engine (12 built)
 Š-228 - production version for Estonia with Walter-built Bristol Mercury VII (four built)
 Š-328F - prototype for Finland, powered by 580 hp (433 kW) Bristol Pegasus IIM-2 radial engine (1 built).
 Š-328 - main production version.  Approx 412 built in total, including:
 Š-328N- night fighter, armed with four forward-firing and two flexibly mounted machine guns.
 Š-328V - floatplane target tug (four built)
 Š-428 - close ground support aircraft covering armies on the battlefield. The engine was an Avia VR-36 545 kW, V-12 liquid-cooled inline piston engine of 740 hp (one built)
 Š-528 - planned replacement for Š-328 developed in 1935, powered by 800 hp (597 kW) Gnome-Rhône Mistral Major (six built).

Specifications (Š-328)

See also

References

Bibliography
 Gerdessen, Frederik. "Estonian Air Power 1918 – 1945". Air Enthusiast, No. 18, April – July 1982. pp. 61–76. .
 
 Green, William and Gordon Swanborough. "Balkan Interlude - The Bulgarian Air Force in WWII". Air Enthusiast. Issue 39, May–August 1989. Bromley, Kent: Tri-Service Press, pp. 58–74. ISSN 0143-5450.
 Mondey, David. The Concise Guide to Axis Aircraft of World War II. London:Chancellor, 1997. .

External links 

 Letov S-328
 Letov S-328 
 Letov S-328V floatplane 

1920s Czechoslovakian military reconnaissance aircraft
Letov aircraft
Single-engined tractor aircraft
Biplanes
Aircraft first flown in 1929